Pavel Šulc (born 29 December 2000) is a Czech footballer who plays as a midfielder for FK Jablonec on loan from Viktoria Plzeň .

Club career

Viktoria Plzeň
He is part of the first team of FC Viktoria Plzeň since 1 January 2020. He played his first match for this team on 17 January 2021 against 1. FK Příbram.

FC Vysočina Jihlava (loan)
On 29 January 2019 he was loaned to FC Vysočina Jihlava in Czech National Football League. In six months long loan he played in 16 league matches and scored 3 goals.

SFC Opava (loan)
On 3 July 2019 he was loaned to SFC Opava in Czech First League. In six months long loan he played in 15 league matches and in 1 Czech Cup match without scoring a goal.

SK Dynamo České Budějovice (loan)
On 26 January 2020 he was loaned to SK Dynamo České Budějovice in Czech First League. In one year long loan he played in 15 league matches and scored 3 goals.

FK Jablonec (loan)
On 21 June 2022 he was loaned to FK Jablonec in Czech First League.

International career
He had played international football at under-18, 19, 20 and 21 level for Czech Republic U18, Czech Republic U19, Czech Republic U20 and Czech Republic U21. He played in 19 matches and scored 5 times.

External links
Pavel Šulc | Reprezentace
 

2000 births
Living people
Czech footballers
Czech Republic under-21 international footballers
Czech Republic youth international footballers
Association football midfielders
Czech First League players
Czech National Football League players
FC Viktoria Plzeň players
SK Dynamo České Budějovice players
FC Vysočina Jihlava players
SFC Opava players
Sportspeople from Karlovy Vary
FK Jablonec players